Holger Bertil Sundström (born 17 April 1925) is a Swedish retired sailor. Together with Pelle Pettersson he won a bronze medal in the Star class at the 1964 Summer Olympics.

References

1925 births
Living people
Olympic bronze medalists for Sweden
Olympic medalists in sailing
Olympic sailors of Sweden
Sailors at the 1964 Summer Olympics – Star
Swedish male sailors (sport)
Medalists at the 1964 Summer Olympics
Sportspeople from Gothenburg